Public transport in Istanbul comprises a bus network, various rail systems, funiculars, and maritime services to serve the more than 18 million inhabitants of the city spread over an area of 5712 km2.

History

Public road transport in Istanbul dates back to 30 August 1869, when a contract to build a tram system in the capital of the Ottoman Empire was signed. With this agreement, Konstantin Krepano Efendi's "Société des Tramways de Constantinople" obtained the concession to operate public transportation for forty years. The inauguration of four lines of horse-driven trams was in 1871. In the first year, the horsecars transported 4.5 million people on the lines Azapkapı-Galata, Aksaray-Yedikule, Aksaray-Topkapı and Eminönü-Aksaray. More lines were added in the following years. 430 horses were used to draw the 45 carriages, including 15 summer-type and some double-deckers, on  track. In 1912, the horse-drawn tram had to cease to operate for one year because the Ministry of Defence sent all the horses to the front during the Balkan War.

The tram network was electrified by overhead contact wire on 2 February 1914. The tram began to run on the Anatolian part of Istanbul on 8 June 1928 between Üsküdar and Kısıklı. By the 1950s, the length of the tram lines reached . The trams were on service on the European side of the city until 12 August 1961 and on the Asian side until 14 November 1966.

The same time as the horsecar started to run, construction of the Tünel, a short funicular between Pera and Galata, began on 30 July 1871. The funicular opened to service on 5 December 1874, the second oldest subway in the world after the London Underground. In the beginning, only freight and livestock were transported. On 17 January 1875, after completing the test runs, the funicular was opened to the public. It is still in service.

A commuter rail line was built on the European side of the city from Sirkeci to Hadımköy in 1872, which was followed in 1873 on the Anatolian part from Haydarpaşa Terminal to İzmit.

The ferry is one of the oldest means of transit in İstanbul, a city with two parts separated by the Bosphorus strait and surrounded by sea. In 1837, British and Russian owned boats started transport on the Bosphorus. The İstanbul Maritime Company was established in 1851 by a decree of Ottoman Sultan Abdülmecid I. The ferry service began in 1853 with six paddle steamers built in the Robert White shipyard in England. The service was extended in 1859 to places around Golden Horn. After 1903 screw-driven steamboats were put in service. Until 1929 boats were imported; later on the ferries were built in the shipyards in Golden Horn. At its peak the fleet contained 40 boats. In 1867, the same company started vehicle transport across the Boğaziçi (Bosphorus) between Kabataş and Üsküdar with two ferries purchased from England, as the first scheduled ferry lines in the world. All ferry companies were nationalized in 1945.

Bus transportation in İstanbul started in 1926 with four Renault-Scania buses between Beyazıt and Karaköy. The fleet grew up from 9 buses in 1942 to 16 in 1955 and to 525 buses in 1960, and then became the backbone of public transport in an ever-enlarging city.

Several British and French companies operated all public transport in İstanbul until 16 June 1939, the date of nationalization. The newly established company İETT (İstanbul Electric Tram and Tünel Company) took over from then on the task of public transport in İstanbul.

On 27 May 1961, trolleybuses were put in service first between Topkapı and Eminönü following the elimination of trams. However, the last trolleybuses were taken out of service in 1984, because they hindered the growing traffic in the narrow streets of the old city.

In 1988, a company called Ulaşım A.Ş. (Transport Inc.) was established to run the services of LRT (light rail transit) (since 1989), Metro (since 2000) and modern trams (since 1992) by the Municipality of Istanbul. The company is still active and will be the operator of the new rail lines.

Transportation today

Metroline

The first line (M1) began service on 3 September 1989 between Aksaray and Kocatepe. The line was further developed step-by-step and reached Atatürk Airport on 20 December 2002. As of 2012, daily ridership was 416 journey and 210,000 passengers. Even if it's numbered as the first line, actually the line is a LRT system with many common characteristics with the T4 line, including the rolling stock. Though they are categorized differently by the operator.

The construction of the underground railway in Istanbul began in 1992. The first line (M2) between Taksim and 4th Levent went into service on September 16, 2000. This line is 8.5 km long and has 6 stations, which all look similar but are in different colours.

A northern extension from 4th Levent to Atatürk Oto Sanayi station in Maslak (ITÜ/Ayazağa) entered service in 2009, as well as a southern extension from Taksim to Şişhane station in Beyoğlu, near the northern entrance of Tünel. The last northern extension for the short term, Hacı Osman was opened in 2011. The southern extension of M2 from Şişhane to Yenikapı over the new Golden Horn Bridge was opened in 2013 permitting the line to reach the Yenikapı Transfer Center. Finally the Airport (M1A) and Bağcılar (M1B) lines' eastern terminus was extended from Aksaray to this transfer center in 2014.

The M3 line runs from Kirazlı station on the M1 line to the northern Başakşehir district. It opened on 14 June 2013.
A southern extension to Bakırköy IDO station and a northern extension to Kayaşehir is under construction.

M6 is a line branching off the M2 from the Levent station running east towards Hisarüstü and Boğaziçi University. It opened on 19 April 2015.

On the Asian side, 26.5 km (16.5 mi) long M4 line opened on 17 August 2012 up to Kartal. The line will have a total of 25 stations when the third section as far as Tuzla opens. A connection to Sabiha Gökçen Airport is under construction.

There is also M5, which links Üsküdar, Ümraniye and Çekmeköy. A further extension to the Sancaktepe and the Sultanbeyli districts is under construction.

Currently there are 124 Hyundai-Rotem (M2) and 120 CAF (M4) trains in service, with a trip along the entire line taking 27 (M2) and 52 (M4) minutes.

All lines are operated by Metro Istanbul (the new name of Istanbul Ulaşım A.Ş.) which belongs to the Municipality of Istanbul.

Tram

Istanbul inaugurated horse trams in 1872 and these served the people of Istanbul until 1912. Following this date, electric trams were put in place and they were the main means for urban public transport until 1966. Many routes were built step by step, and it reached their most widespread network in 1956 with 108 million passengers in 270 shuttles in 56 lines. Tramcars were not modernized for many decades, and some of the 1911 electric cars were still running in the 1960s. At that time modern buses provided faster and smoother journeys. Because of those negative issues, tram system closed in mid-1960s.

From the early 1970s, traffic congestion worsened. By the mid-1980s, Istanbulites realized that the uncontrolled extension of motorization & closure of the tram network had been a mistake. Other cities around the world, e.g. Tunis and Buenos Aires, also understood that error, and like them, Istanbul also planned the return of tramway.

As an experiment, Istanbul first opened a heritage tram at European side in 1990. Due to increasing popularity, they opened a modern tram system starting in 1992, also at European side. Now, the Asian side has a heritage tram system, whereas the European side has both a heritage tram and a modern tram system.

The modern tram consists of lines T1, T4 and T5, initially operated with 55 low-floor Bombardier Flexity Swift and 32 Alstom Citadis.
The line T4 was opened in 2007 between Edirnekapı and Mescid-i Selam. There are 22 stations and length is 15,3 km. Since March 2009, the line works between Topkapı and Mescid-i Selam.  Service is operated with LRT vehicles built by SGP in 1989. As of 2019, daily ridership was 446 journeys and 196,000 passengers.

Commuter rail

Starting from June 2013, suburban lines on both sides of the city (Istanbul suburban and Haydarpaşa suburban) were closed for rehabilitation works as well as for their fusion into a single line by the means of an undersea tunnel through the Bosphorus as part of the Marmaray project.

On 12 March 2019, the whole parts of the Marmaray are operational. A further extension to Bahçeşehir via Ispartakule is proposed.

Funicular

Istanbul is served by three underground funicular railways, of very different ages and styles.

The older of these lines is the Tünel. This line is the oldest underground metro line in continental Europe, and the second in the world after London.  The Tünel is 573 m long with an altitude difference of 60 m and no intermediate stations between Karaköy and Tünel Square. It has been continuously in service since 1875. It was originally steam-powered with two wooden trains serving parallel tracks. It was modernized in 1971. Today the line is single-track with a passing loop, electrically powered and runs on rubber tyres with rebuilt ex-RATP MP 55 vehicles. A trip takes approximately 1.5 minutes. About 15,000 people use the line each day.
Unlike the modern one below which runs at strictly five-minute intervals, this one has a less regular schedule.

Opened in June 2006, a second modern funicular line, the Kabataş-Taksim Funicular, is operated by Ulaşım A.Ş. and connects the Seabus port and tram stop of Kabataş with the metro station at Taksim Square. It is about 600 meters long and climbs approximately 60 meters in 110 seconds.

In October 2022 the newest funicular line the F4 (Istanbul Metro) Boğaziçi Üni./Hisarüstü-Aşiyan funicular line opened and operated by Ulaşım A.Ş. It connects with M6 (İstanbul Metro) line at Boğaziçi University.

Bus rapid transit (BRT)

The bus rapid transit (BRT) system in Istanbul is called Metrobüs. The construction of the Metrobüs BRT line began in 2005. The first line runs between Avcılar and Söğütlüçeşme. This line is 41.5 km long and has 35 stations, which are located on Istanbul's Main Highway, called the D 100. It is currently operated with Mercedes Capacity, Mercedes-Benz Citaro, and some Phileas buses. Daily ridership is 715.000 passenger.

An extension to Beylikdüzü opened in 2012.

Bus system

The bus fleet has a total of 4,012 vehicles built by MAN, Ikarus, Mercedes-Benz, BMC, Phileas, Otokar, Temsa and Güleryüz. In 2012 the daily ridership was 3,621,908 passengers, representing 30% of the city's total daily transportation.

Since 1985, privately owned ÖHO (Özel Halk Otobüsü - Private Public Bus) buses have been allowed to operate under the authority of İETT. There are 2,157 private owned public buses, including 144 double-deckers. There are 783 bus lines excluding diversions as of May 21, 2018. Many routes have diversions running one roundtrip a day on average, which usually feed less developed suburbs around frequent routes. Some routes also provide short turning services at peak hours for crowded stops. Those diversions are listed under the same headsign reference as main route. Buses running diversion routes do not display route numbers, spelling out the route on the headsign in detail instead.
In 2010, the municipality decided to found a new company called Otobüs A.Ş. (Bus Inc.) in order to more quickly replace old vehicles. Otobüs A.Ş. had a fleet of 544 vehicles as of December 2012. The vehicles are fully low floor and certified to Euro 5 standards. In 2014, IETT carried 1.31 billion ticketed passengers, a record for a Turkish transport system. İETT is currently trialling outsourcing the drivers and maintenance into private bus company Akkurtlar. Outsourced drivers can be distinguished by their uniforms.

Ferryboats

Ferryboats sail on 15 lines serving 27 seaports on the shores of Bosphorus and Sea of Marmara. The 20 older ferryboats carry 61 million passengers yearly. In the 1980s 150 million people were transported.

Today, there are 3 types of ferry in İstanbul; Sea Busses (İDO), Vapur's (traditional name for commuter ferries) and private motorboats.

The first steam ferries appeared on the Bosphorus in 1837 and were operated by private sector companies. Since March 2006, Istanbul's traditional commuter ferries have been operated by municipality. In 2017, the municipality established a system for musicians to play live music for passengers in the lower salons of most ferry lines.

The current design of the Istanbul ferries, as we know them today, was largely created by the Fairfield Shipbuilders of Glasgow, Scotland, which also built the largest amount of Istanbul ferries since 1851. The companies which designed and built the traditional commuter ferries of Istanbul include the White Shipbuilders of East Cowes, England (models of 1854–1860); the M. Wigram Shipbuilders of London, England (models of 1863–1869); Maudslay & Sons of London, England (models of 1870–1872); R. & H. Green Shipbuilders of London, England (models of 1872-1890 and 1894–1896); J. W. Thames of London, England (models of 1890–1893); Napier, Shanks & Bell of Glasgow, Scotland (models of 1893–1894); Fairfield Shipbuilders of Glasgow, Scotland (models of 1903–1906, 1910–1911, 1914–1929, and 1938–1962); Armstrong Shipbuilders in Newcastle and Glasgow, United Kingdom (models of 1905–1907); Atl. & Chantiers de France in Dunkerque, France (models of 1907–1911); Hawthorn Leslie and Company in Newcastle, England (models of 1911); Kinderdijk L. Smith & Zoon Ltd, Holland (models of 1951); Cantieri Navali di Taranto SPA, Taranto, Italy (models of 1952); and Hasköy, Camialtı, and İstinye Shipyards in Istanbul (models of 1929-1938 and 1962–1989).

Seabus

On 16 April 1987 the Municipality of Istanbul established a company to provide fast sea transport with catamaran-type seabuses. With the first ten vessels purchased from Norway, modernization of sea transportation was achieved. Today, the company İDO serves 29 terminals with a fleet of 28 catamarans, including six fast car ferries.

Aerial lift

There is a short gondola lift line above the Democracy Park in the valley between Taksim and Maçka, the Maçka Gondola, built in 1993. It connects the hotels Hilton Istanbul Bosphorus on one side with Parksa Hilton and Swissotel The Bosphorus on the other side. The trip takes three minutes.

A second aerial lift line, the Eyüp Gondola was opened in 2005 between the historical district of Eyüp and the Pierre Loti Hill. The gondola lift, built by the Italian Leitner Ropeways Co. of Leitner Group was the most expensive cable car line in Turkey costing 5 million Euros.

Statistics
The average time that people spend commuting with public transit in Istanbul, for example to and from work, on a weekday is 91 min. About 30% of public transit users ride for more than 2 h every day. The average amount of time people wait at a stop or station for public transit is 19 min, and 36% of riders wait for over 20 min on average every day. The average distance that people usually ride in a single trip by public transit is 12 km, and 35% travel for over 12 km.

Smart Ticket

Istanbul has an integrated electronic ticket system for bus, funiculars, LRT, metro, commuter trains, ferryboats and trams. The system uses smart RFID cards, called Istanbulkart, as tickets. The old Akbil iButtons were phased out in 2015.

See also
 Istanbul nostalgic tramways
 Sabiha Gökçen Airport
 Metrobus (Istanbul)
 Ferries in Istanbul
 Istanbul Airport
 Istanbul Metro
 Istanbul Tram
 Marmaray
 Boji (dog)

References

External links

İstanbul public transport websites 
These official websites include timetables and maps
Buses & Funicular
Municipal Bus Transport Authority of Istanbul IETT

Trains & Trams
Metro Istanbul (operator of İstanbul's modern rail systems)
Marmaray (contains general information about the line/project including timetables)

Ferry Services 
 İDO  İstanbul Sea Ferries (catamaran)
 Şehir Hatları (operator of traditional ferries)

Interactive Transit Maps
 http://www.istanbulmetromap.com  Metrobus / Metro / Tramway

Other links 
Timeline of the Istanbul (Turkey) Rail Transit Network - CityRailTransit.com
The Istanbul metro - UrbanRail.net
Public Transport by Rail in Turkish Cities - Rail Turkey

 
Public utilities of Turkey